Scopula inactuosa is a moth of the  family Geometridae. It is found on Sumbawa.

References

Moths described in 1920
inactuosa
Moths of Indonesia